Nicedisc are an experimental audio/video duo consisting of Jeffrey Pash and Nick Phillips. Influenced by the structural film movement, Nicedisc's work thus far has tended towards minimalism and austerity. In 2004, the duo released the DVD "Untitled" on Brooklyn label Rebuild All Your Ruins. The DVD features three extended audio/video pieces centered on the use of full-screen color flickers and fades.

Art duos
American experimental filmmakers